Deadman Lake or Deadmans Lake may refer to:

Deadman Lake (Alberta)
Deadman Lake (Nova Scotia)
Deadmans Lake (South Dakota)
Deadman Lake (Utah)